The Dong-Feng 15 (a.k.a. DF-15, M-9, CSS-6) is a short-range ballistic missile developed by the People's Republic of China. The DF-15 and the newer DF-16 are thought to be the only non-nuclear missiles in use by the People's Liberation Army Rocket Force. The U.S. Department of Defense estimated in 2008 that China had 315–355 DF-15 missiles and 90–110 launchers.

History 
Development on the DF-15 began in 1985 with a finalized design proposal being approved by the PLA in 1987.  From the late 1980s to the mid-1990s, testing of the missile was done in the Gobi Desert.  The first public display of the missile took place at the Beijing Defense Exposition in 1986.  The Second Artillery Corps had allegedly deployed a small number of the missiles the following year.

In 1989, Libya agreed to finance Syria's purchase of M-9 missiles from China. The sale of missiles to Syria were cancelled under U.S. pressure in 1991.

Description 
The DF-15 uses a solid fuel, single-stage rocket. It is vertically launched from an eight-wheeled transporter erector launcher (TEL). The missile's trajectory is guided using small thrusters and an inertial guidance system on the warhead. The warhead is only a tenth of the size of the missile body. After the body and warhead separate, the body trails behind to camouflage the warhead. The terminal velocity of the missile is over Mach 6.

The DF-15A is a variant that employs control fins at the rear of the missile and on the reentry vehicle, GPS updates, and terminal radar guidance. The DF-15B is a further upgraded variant with similar features, as well as an active radar seeker, laser rangefinder, and maneuverable reentry vehicle.

It was originally designed with the capability of destroying the Heng Shan Military Command Center in Taiwan's capital of Taipei, which was built to withstand a 20 kiloton nuclear blast, a 2 kiloton conventional bomb blast, or an electromagnetic pulse; another target would be Chiashan Air Force Base. In the event of an invasion, the destruction of Taiwan's major command center would make it difficult to coordinate defenses. The missile's range also reaches locations as far as Kyushu in Japan, U.S. military bases in Okinawa and the Indian capital of New Delhi.

See also
 DF-16

References

External links
CSIS Missile Threat – DF-15
 Sinodefense description

Ballistic missiles of the People's Republic of China
Weapons of the People's Republic of China
Military equipment introduced in the 1990s